Marko Filipović (Serbian Cyrillic: Марко Филиповић, born 6 August 1978) is a Bosnian-Herzegovinian retired football player.

References

External links
 
 Profile at Footmercato
 Profile at Angers SCO
 Hajduk Beograd 2004-05 squad at EUFO

1978 births
Living people
People from Teslić
Serbs of Bosnia and Herzegovina
Association football midfielders
Bosnia and Herzegovina footballers
FK Mladi Radnik players
OFK Beograd players
FK Hajduk Beograd players
FC Atyrau players
Angers SCO players
FC Baulmes players
FC Istres players
SC Toulon players
FC Bavois players
First League of Serbia and Montenegro players
Kazakhstan Premier League players
Championnat National players
Championnat National 2 players
Swiss Challenge League players
Swiss Promotion League players
Bosnia and Herzegovina expatriate footballers
Expatriate footballers in Serbia and Montenegro
Bosnia and Herzegovina expatriate sportspeople in Serbia and Montenegro
Expatriate footballers in Kazakhstan
Bosnia and Herzegovina expatriate sportspeople in Kazakhstan
Expatriate footballers in France
Bosnia and Herzegovina expatriate sportspeople in France
Expatriate footballers in Switzerland
Bosnia and Herzegovina expatriate sportspeople in Switzerland